Tilbury is a port town in the borough of Thurrock, Essex, England. The present town was established as separate settlement in the late 19th century, on land that was mainly part of Chadwell St Mary. It contains a 16th century fort and an ancient cross-river ferry. Tilbury is part of the Port of London with a major deep-water port which contributes to the local economy. Situated 24 miles (38.5 km) east of central London and 23 miles (37 km) southwest of Southend-on-Sea (the nearest city), it is also the southernmost point in Essex.

Etymology
The name of the present town of Tilbury is derived (by way of the port) from the nearby settlements of East and West Tilbury. The name of these settlements is derived from the Saxon burgh, "fortified place", either belonging to Tila, or perhaps at a lowland place. The 8th century spelling (Bede) was "Tilaburg", and the spelling in Domesday was "Tilberia".

History
Tilbury's history is closely connected with its geographical location (see below). Its counterpart on the south bank of the River Thames, Gravesend, has long been an important communications link, and it was there that a cross-river ferry (see below) was connected, mainly due to the narrowness of the river at this point. In addition, Gravesend and Northfleet (also on the south shore) both became vitally important to shipping on the Thames: the former as the first port of call for foreign shipping bound for London, and the latter as a naval dockyard.

There is archaeological evidence of Roman occupation. At the time, sea-levels had dropped, making the marshes habitable. There may well have been a Roman settlement on the site of what is now Tilbury Docks. In the 12th century the river, which had hitherto consisted of difficult channels with uncharted shoals, was changed by the process of embanking the river and enclosing areas of marsh. This improved the river's flow, and also resulted in improved land resources on the marsh. It was nevertheless an unhealthy place in which to live; Daniel Defoe, who, in 1696, operated a tile and brick factory in the Tilbury marshes and lived in a nearby house, wrote about "the Essex ague".

In 1588 Queen Elizabeth I came ashore here to review her main army at the nearby village of West Tilbury (see Speech to the Troops at Tilbury).

In 1852 an Act of Parliament had authorised the building of the London Tilbury and Southend Railway (LTSR), with a short spur to take advantage of the ferry over the Thames; a pier nearby was constructed for the steamboat traffic. The station was originally named Tilbury Fort and opened in 1854. The station was renamed Tilbury Riverside railway station in 1936.

A few houses were built for the railway workers, but it was not until the construction of Tilbury Docks (see below) that there was any settlement worthy of a name. Whilst the docks were being built, the thousands of workers were either provided with temporary accommodation or had to commute from surrounding villages and towns. As a result of overcrowding, more permanent housing was built once the docks were completed, including tenement blocks; but these were poorly constructed, and until the formation of Tilbury District Council (see below) the town was in a poor state, as it largely remained until 1918, when government funds were available to better the situation.

Tilbury Ferry

Tilbury–Gravesend Ferry has operated from very early times. A sketch-map of 1571 shows evidence of two jetties, the one on the north bank leading to a northward road crossing the marsh. There are also houses marked on the marsh itself, which became important for sheep grazing; and there is some evidence to suggest that the ferry was used for the cross-river transport of animals and wool. Although the 17th century drawing might suggest a boat too small for large consignments, the long-established Gravesend market encouraged such traffic, and a contemporary account suggests that one of the boats used was a hoy, a forerunner of the Thames sailing barge.

Tilbury Fort

The curve and narrowness of the river here made it a suitable place to construct forts for the defence of London against foreign invaders. The first permanent fort at Tilbury was a D-shaped blockhouse built in 1539 by Henry VIII and initially called the "Thermitage Bulwark", because it was on the site of a hermitage dissolved in 1536. The Tilbury blockhouse was designed to cross-fire with a similar structure at New Tavern, Gravesend. During the Armada campaign (1588), the fort was reinforced with earthworks and a palisade, and a boom of chains, ships' masts and cables was stretched across the Thames to Gravesend, anchored by lighters. The fort was rebuilt under Charles I and is now owned by English Heritage.

Governance
Until 1903, the marshland area was part of the traditional parish and civil parish of Chadwell St Mary, which reached south to the River Thames. The parish of Tilbury Docks was established in 1903 and the Tilbury Urban District Council (UDC) in 1912; it merged with Thurrock UDC in 1936. This in turn became a borough in 1984 and then the Thurrock Unitary Authority in 1998. There are two wards covering the town, each served by two councillors: Tilbury Riverside and Thurrock Park for the southern part and Tilbury St Chad's in the north. As of May 2016 there are 3 Labour and 1 UKIP councillors. The Member of Parliament for Thurrock is Jackie Doyle-Price.

Geography
The area to the north is one-time marshlands; to the north of that there is higher ground, where lie the villages of Chadwell St Mary, West and East Tilbury. The town lies to the north of the London-Southend railway line. Tilbury is located east of the capital of England, London

The major landmarks are the docks, the cruise-ship landing stage, and the Tilbury Power Station. There are two churches in Tilbury: St John's (Church of England) and Our Lady Star of the Sea (Roman Catholic); there is also a Convent of Mercy. There is, in addition, a synagogue in Dock Road. The educational institutions in Tilbury include primary education, which are Lansdowne Primary School, St Mary's RC Primary School and Tilbury Manor Primary School renamed Tilbury Pioneer Academy when the school was taken over by the Gateway Learning Community, a local collective of several schools in the local area. The last serve Infant and Nursery, as well as Junior children. Lying just outside the town is the Gateway Academy, the main secondary school for Tilbury, Chadwell St Mary and the eastern parts of Grays, as well as the adjoining Gateway Primary Free School. Additionally, USP College (Palmers Campus) lies in east Grays near Tilbury.

Transport and industry

The Port of Tilbury handles a variety of bulk cargo, timber, cars and container traffic and remains, along with Southampton and Felixstowe, one of Britain's three major container ports. It is the main UK port for importing paper, including newsprint. The one-time passenger landing stage was reopened by the Port of Tilbury group as the London Cruise Terminal, though it is no longer served by the railway.

Until the introduction of standardised containers, the majority of the town's inhabitants were employed in the docks. The resulting loss of jobs has never been made up. So Tilbury today has high unemployment, and education and employment prospects are widely perceived as poor.

Thurrock Council, together with Kent County Council, subsidises the ferry between Tilbury and Gravesend, which was operated by Lower Thames & Medway Passenger Boat Company and then by Jetstream Tours. Tilbury Town railway station is on the c2c (London, Tilbury and Southend) rail route, providing services to London Fenchurch Street and Southend. Off-peak services operate via Ockendon & Upminster and run between Southend Central & Fenchurch Street calling at all stations. Services are extended to Shoeburyness at weekends. During peak times, many services operate via Rainham, do not necessarily call at all stations and terminate at Pitsea. Some do extend further into Southend. Tilbury Riverside railway station was closed on 29 November 1992, although the railway still serves the nearby container depot. Bus route 99 (operated in partnership by both c2c rail and Ensignbus) connects residential Tilbury & Tilbury Town railway station to Tilbury Amazon (peak only), Tilbury ASDA and the ferry. Ensignbus services 66, 73(A) and the recently introduced 77(A) serve Tilbury, connecting the town with Grays and Lakeside Shopping Centre. Route 66 operates between Grays, Little Thurrock and Tilbury Mon-Sun daytime with a weekday extension to Chadwell St Mary's Brentwood Road Estate. This route formerly served Lakeside until the start of the COVID-19 pandemic. Route 73 operates Mon-Sat daytime between Lakeside, Grays, USP College (Palmers Campus) and Tilbury. Route 73A is responsible for Sunday service between Lakeside, Grays, USP College (Palmers Campus), Chadwell St Mary's Brentwood Road Estate & Tilbury. Route 77(A) operates during early mornings and evenings Mon-Sat instead of route 73(A) and along the same routing, additionally connecting Tilbury with Belhus & Aveley in northwest Thurrock. Evening services extend from Tilbury to the station and the nearby ASDA supermarket. Services with the suffix "A" serve Chadwell St Mary's Brentwood Road Estate. Those without do not serve the Estate. The Amazon warehouse built near ASDA also has dedicated bus routes operated by Ensignbus that operate at peak times. These are the Z1, which serves local communities in Thurrock along the same routing as route 77, the Z2, which operates express services to Rainham, Dagenham, Barking & Canning Town in East London making local stops between Rainham and Barking, and the Z4 which operates services to Stanford-Le-Hope, Basildon & Pitsea. The Z-routes operate everyday to provide easier travel for Amazon warehouse workers from communities that formerly were difficult to get to and from Tilbury using public transport. National Cycle Route 13 from London to Norfolk passes through the town.

People and culture
The Tilbury Band, dating from 1919, was among the leading brass bands in the UK.

Notable people who have had some connection with Tilbury include: three football players, John Evans (1929–2004), who played for Liverpool, Tom Scannell (1925–1994),who played for Liverpool; Noel Betowski, artist, who was born there in 1952; Thomas Horrocks Openshaw (1856–1929), who was a consultant surgeon at Tilbury Hospital; and actor Adewale Akinnuoye-Agbaje whose childhood being raised there by foster parents is documented in the movie Farming.

In the 2014 BBC series The Honourable Woman, the title character Nessa Stein is made Baroness of Tilbury in the first episode.

Tilbury and its environs have been used in some television episodes. Tilbury Fort was used as a location for Sharpe's Regiment, starring Sean Bean.

Sport and leisure
Tilbury has a non-League football club Tilbury F.C. who play at Chadfields. Chadfields had previously been a greyhound racing track. The racing was independent (not affiliated to the sports governing body the National Greyhound Racing Club) and was known as a flapping track, which was the nickname given to independent tracks. The racing is believed to have been operational in the 1930s and lasted until 1947, when a betting licence had been granted.

A later venue called the Tilbury Stadium on land at the end of Dunlop Road also hosted greyhounds between 1964 and 1967.

References

 
Towns in Essex
Thurrock
Populated places on the River Thames